NA-27 Khyber is a constituency for the National Assembly of Pakistan comprising Bara Subdivision and Chora section of Jamrud Subdivision in Khyber District. In 2022 Delimitations NA-27 covers all of Khyber District.

Members of Parliament

2002–2018: NA-46 Tribal Area-XI

2018-2022: NA-44 Tribal Area-V

Election 2002 

General elections were held on 10 Oct 2002. Maulana Khalilur Rehman Afridi an Independent candidate won by 5,611 votes.

Election 2008 

The result of general election 2008 in this constituency is given below.

Result 
Hamidullah Jan Afridi succeeded in the election 2008 and became the member of National Assembly.

Election 2013 

General elections were held on 11 May 2013. Nasir Khan an Independent candidate won votes and became the  member of National Assembly. However an Election tribunal later declared the result null and void on accusation of rigging, and ordered a re-election in the constituency.

Election 2018 

General elections were held on 25 July 2018.

By-election 2023 
A by-election will be held on 19 March 2023 due to the resignation of Mohammed Iqbal Khan Afridi, the previous MNA from this seat.

See also
NA-26 Mohmand
NA-28 Peshawar-I

References

External links 
 Election result's official website

44
44